Matt Dunning (born 19 December 1978) is a former Australian rugby union footballer. He played as a prop for the Waratahs and Western Force in Super Rugby, and represented Australia. He coached the Balmain rugby club in Sydney 2013/2014.

Early life
Dunning was born in Calgary, Canada, but grew up in Sydney, Australia. He was educated at Northholm Grammar School. In 1996, he was selected to represent New South Wales at the Australian Schools Rugby Championships. He went on to play for Australian Schools, U19s and U21s. His brother is Canadian prop Casey Dunning.

Rugby career
Dunning made his debut for the New South Wales Waratahs in a Ricoh Championship match against Queensland in 2000, and played his first Super 14 match against the Chiefs in 2001. He made his international test debut on 25 October 2003 during the 2003 Rugby World Cup at the age of 24. The match against Namibia was won 142-0 and is the largest winning margin for an Australian side. The only other match he played in during the tournament was the 17–20 loss against England in the final.
He is also known for his drop goal in the 2003 Super 12 season. His team, the NSW Waratahs, needed a bonus point to make the finals. Since the Waratahs were playing with advantage, and still needed two more tries to gain the bonus point, Dunning decided to kick a drop goal, which he assumed would miss. This would result in the penalty being awarded, which would allow the ball to be kicked into touch and possibly a line-out drive that could lead to a try. Unfortunately, the kick hit its mark and sailed through the posts, much to his and his teammates' dismay.

Dunning was selected for the 2007 Rugby World Cup and played in all four matches for Australia in the tournament including the 10–12 loss against England in the quarter final. His scrummaging style has at times been criticized.

In 2008, Dunning ruptured his right Achilles tendon playing for the Wallabies against the Barbarians at Wembley Stadium. It was the first time rugby union had been played at the stadium since it was rebuilt and the surface was unstable and dangerous. The injury kept him out of the 2009 Super 14 season but after a good spell with his Sydney club Eastwood, he forced his way back into the Wallabies for the 2009 northern hemisphere tour. In 2010 he joined the Western Force, where he played two seasons.

Dunning went to France in 2011 to join Top 14 club Biarritz Olympique, but was forced to withdraw from his contract and return to Sydney to undergo neck surgery. He played for Eastwood in their Shute Shield Grand Final Win over Sydney University in 2011, before retiring from top-level rugby.

References

External links
Waratahs profile
Wallabies profile

1978 births
Australian rugby union coaches
Australian rugby union players
Australia international rugby union players
New South Wales Waratahs players
Western Force players
Australian people of Canadian descent
Canadian rugby union players
Sportspeople from Calgary
Living people
Rugby union players from Sydney
Rugby union props